Julia Lashae (born Julia Louise Lawshae; July 22, 1969) is an American actress and singer.

Filmography

Discography
 2003 Introducing...  Julia LaShae, CD 
 2009 Eadem Mutato Resurgo, CD

References

1969 births
American actresses
American women singers
Living people
21st-century American women